Matthias Mann (born 10 October 1959) is a scientist in the area of mass spectrometry and proteomics.

Early life and education
Born in Germany he studied mathematics and physics at the University of Göttingen. He received his Ph.D. in 1988 at Yale University where he worked in the group of John Fenn, who was later awarded the Nobel Prize in Chemistry.

Career
After a postdoctoral fellowship at the University of Southern Denmark in Odense Mann became group leader at the European Molecular Biology Laboratory (EMBL) in Heidelberg. Later he went back to Odense as a professor of bioinformatics. Since 2005 he has been a director at the Max Planck Institute of Biochemistry in Munich. In addition, he became a principal investigator at the newly founded "Novo Nordisk Foundation Center for Protein Research" in Copenhagen.

From his research group in Munich originated in 2016 PreOmics – a company commercializing sample prep sets, and EVOSEP – a company commercializing protein analysis equipment.

His work has impact in various fields of mass spectrometry-based proteomics:

 The peptide sequence tag approach developed at the EMBL was one of the first methods for the identification of peptides based on mass spectra and genome data.
 Nano-electrospray (an electrospray technique with very low flow rates) was the first method that allowed femtomole sequencing of proteins from polyacrylamide gels.
 A recently developed metabolic labeling technique called SILAC (stable isotope labeling with amino acids in cell culture) is widely used in quantitative proteomics.

Other activities
 PharmaFluidics, Member of the Advisory Board (since 2019)

Awards and honors
1991: Malcom Award by the journal Organic Mass Spectrometry 
1996: Mattauch Herzog Prize in Mass Spectrometry
1997: Hewlett-Packard Prize for Strategic Research in Automation of Sample Preparation 
1998: Edman Prize by the "Methods in Protein Structure Analysis" Society 
1999: Bieman Medal for Outstanding Achievement in Mass Spectrometry (American Society for Mass Spectrometry) 
1999: Named second most cited scientist in chemistry in the years 1994 to 1996 by the Institute of Scientific Information 
1999: Elected visiting professor Harvard Medical School 
1999: Elected to the European Molecular Biology Organization (EMBO)
2000: Meyenburg Prize
2001: Bernhard and Matha Rasmussens Memorial award in Cancer Research
2001: Meyenburg Cancer Research Award given by the German Cancer Research Center
2001: Fresenius Prize and Medal for Analytical Chemistry given by the German Chemical Society
2004: Honorary Doctorate, University of Utrecht, Netherlands
2004: Lundbeck Prize
2004: Novo-Nordisk Prize
2005: Anfinsen Award of the Protein Society
2006: "Biochemical Analysis" prize by the German Society for Clinical Chemistry and Laboratory Medicine
2008: HUPO Distinguished Achievement Award in Proteomic Science
2008: Bijvoet Medal of the Bijvoet Center for Biomolecular Research of Utrecht University
2010: Friedrich Wilhelm Joseph von Schelling-Prize by the Bavarian Academy of Sciences and Humanities
2012: Gottfried Wilhelm Leibniz Prize by German Research Foundation
2012: Feodor Lynen Medal
2012: Louis-Jeantet Prize for Medicine
2012: Ernst Schering Prize
 2015: Theodor Bücher Lecture and Medal
 2015: Danish Order of Dannebrog Knights Cross
 2015: Barry L. Karger Medal in Bioanalytical Chemistry
 2017: Lennart Philipson Award

References

External links
 
 Homepage of the Mann department at the MPI of Biochemistry
 Nature article about the Novo Nordisk Foundation Center for Protein Research Denmark launches big push for protein power

German biochemists
Living people
20th-century German biologists
1959 births
Bijvoet Medal recipients
Gottfried Wilhelm Leibniz Prize winners
Mass spectrometrists
21st-century German biologists
Max Planck Society people
Members of the German Academy of Sciences Leopoldina
Members of the Bavarian Academy of Sciences
Members of the European Molecular Biology Organization
Max Planck Institute directors